Johnny Mnemonic is a 1995 cyberpunk film directed by Robert Longo in his directorial debut. Based on the 1981 story of the same name by William Gibson, it stars Keanu Reeves and Dolph Lundgren. Reeves plays the title character, a man with an overloaded, cybernetic brain implant designed to store information. The film portrays Gibson's dystopian, prophetic view of 2021 with the world wracked by a tech-induced plague, awash with conspiracies, and dominated by megacorporations, with strong East Asian influences.

Shot on location in Canada, with Toronto and Montreal filling in for the Newark and Beijing settings, a number of local sites, including Toronto's Union Station and Montreal's skyline and Jacques Cartier Bridge, are prominently featured.

A longer version (103 mins) of the film that is closer to the director's cut premiered in Japan on April 15, 1995, featuring a score by Mychael Danna and different editing. The film was released in the United States on May 26, 1995. In 2022, a black-and-white edition of the film, titled Johnny Mnemonic: In Black and White, was released.

Plot
In 2021, society is driven by a virtual Internet, which has created a degenerate effect called "nerve attenuation syndrome" or NAS. Megacorporations control much of the world, intensifying the class hostility already created by NAS.

Johnny is a "mnemonic courier" who discreetly transports sensitive data for corporations in a storage device implanted in his brain at the cost of his childhood memories. His current job is for a group of scientists in Beijing. Johnny initially balks when he learns the data exceeds his memory capacity even with compression, but agrees given the large fee will be enough to cover the cost of the operation to remove the device. Johnny warns that he must have the data extracted within a few days or suffer psychological damage. The scientists encrypt the data with three random images from a television feed and start sending these images to the receiver in Newark, New Jersey, but they are attacked and killed by the Yakuza, led by a man Shinji (Akiyama) who wields a laser trip wire beam weapon, before the images can be fully transmitted. Johnny escapes with a portion of the images but is pursued by both the Yakuza as well as security forces for Pharmakom, one of the mega-corporations run by Takahashi (Kitano), both seeking the data he carries. Johnny starts witnessing brief images of a female projection of an artificial intelligence (AI) who attempts to aid Johnny, but he dismisses her.

In Newark, Johnny meets with his handler Ralfi (Kier) to explain the situation but finds Ralfi is also working with the Yakuza and wants to kill Johnny to get the storage device. Johnny is rescued by Jane (Meyer), a cybernetically-enhanced bodyguard, and members of anti-establishment Lo-Teks and their leader J-Bone (Ice-T), while Ralfi is sliced into pieces by Shinji for getting in his way. Jane takes Johnny to a clinic run by Spider (Rollins), who had installed Jane's implants. Spider reveals he was intended to receive the Beijing scientists' data, which is the cure for NAS stolen from Pharmakom; Spider claims Pharmakom refuses to release the cure as they are profiting off the mitigation of NAS. Unfortunately, even the portion of the encryption images Johnny took and what Spider had received is not sufficient to decrypt Johnny's mind, and Spider suggests that they see Jones at the Lo-Teks' base. Just then, Karl "The Street Preacher" (Lundgren), an assassin hired by Takahashi, attacks the clinic, killing Spider as Johnny and Jane escape.

The two reach the Lo-Tek base and learn from J-Bone that Jones is a dolphin once used by the Navy that can help decrypt the data in Johnny's mind. Just as they start the procedure, Shinji and the Yakuza, Takahashi and his security forces, and the Street Preacher all attack the base. Takahashi confronts Johnny and holds him at gunpoint before being gunned down by Shinji who wants the data for himself. Johnny fights Shinji who gains the upper hand, but Johnny manages to turn the tables and behead Shinji with his own laser wire. Takahashi having a last-minute change of heart turns over a portion of the encryption key to Johnny before he dies, but this still is not enough to fully decrypt the data, and J-Bone tells Johnny that he will need to hack his own mind with Jones' help. Johnny, Jane, J Bone and the Lo Teks manage to defeat the remaining forces sent after them. The Street Preacher arrives and after a fight is defeated by Johnny and Jane by being electrocuted and burned to a crisp.
The second attempt starts, and aided by the female AI, Johnny is able to decrypt the data and at the same time recover his childhood memories. The AI is revealed to be the virtual version of Johnny's mother who was also the founder of Pharmakom, angered at the company holding back the cure. As J-Bone transmits the NAS cure information across the Internet, Johnny and Jane watch from afar as the Pharmakom headquarters goes up in flames from the public outcry. J Bone in celebration also disposes of the Street Preacher's burnt corpse by having it tossed into the city waters of Newark.

Cast
 Keanu Reeves as Johnny Mnemonic
 Dolph Lundgren as Karl Honig
 Dina Meyer as Jane
 Ice-T as J-Bone
 Takeshi Kitano as Takahashi
 Denis Akiyama as Shinji
 Henry Rollins as Spider
 Barbara Sukowa as Anna Kalmann
 Udo Kier as Ralfi
 Tracy Tweed as Pretty
 Falconer Abraham as Yomamma
 Don Francks as Hooky
 Diego Chambers as Henson
 Arthur Eng as Viet

Production
Longo and Gibson originally envisioned making an art film on a small budget but failed to get financing. Longo commented that the project "started out as an arty 1½-million-dollar movie, and it became a 30-million-dollar movie because we couldn't get a million and a half."  Longo's lawyer suggested that their problem was that they were not asking for enough money and that studios would not be interested in such a small project.  The unbounded spread of the Internet in the early 1990s and the consequent rapid growth of high technology culture had made cyberpunk increasingly relevant, and this was a primary motivation for Sony Pictures's decision to fund the project in the tens of millions.  Val Kilmer was originally cast in the title role, and Reeves replaced him when Kilmer dropped out.  Reeves' Canadian nationality opened up further financial options, such as Canadian tax incentives.  When Speed turned into a major hit in 1994, expectations were raised for Johnny Mnemonic, and Sony saw the film as a potential blockbuster hit.

Longo's experiences with the financiers were poor, believing that their demands compromised his artistic vision.  Many of the casting decisions, such as Lundgren, were forced upon him to increase the film's appeal outside of the United States.  Longo and Gibson, who had no idea what to do with Lundgren, created a new character for him.  Lundgren had previously starred in several action films that emphasized his physique.  He intended the role of the street preacher to be a showcase for further range as an actor, but his character's monologue was cut during editing. Gibson said that the monologue, a sermon about transhumanism that Lundgren delivered naked, was cut due to fears of offending religious groups.  Kitano was cast to appeal to the Japanese market.  Eight minutes of extra footage starring Kitano was shot for the Japanese release of the film.

The film significantly deviates from the short story, most notably turning Johnny, not his bodyguard partner, into the primary action figure. Molly Millions is replaced with Jane, as the film rights to Molly had already been sold. Nerve Attenuation Syndrome (NAS) is a fictional disease that is not present in the short story. NAS, also called "the black shakes", is caused by an overexposure to electromagnetic radiation from omnipresent technological devices and is presented as a raging epidemic. In the film, one pharmaceutical corporation has found a cure but chooses to withhold it from the public in favor of a more lucrative treatment program. The code-cracking Navy dolphin Jones's reliance on heroin was one of many scenes cut during an editing process.  Gibson said that the film was "taken away and re-cut by the American distributor".  He described the original film as "a very funny, very alternative piece of work", and said it was "very unsuccessfully chopped and cut into something more mainstream".  Gibson compared this to editing Blue Velvet into a mainstream thriller lacking any irony. Prior to its release, critic Amy Harmon identified the film as an epochal moment when cyberpunk counterculture would enter the mainstream.  News of the script's compromises spurred pre-release concerns that the film would prove a disappointment to hardcore cyberpunks.

The Japanese soundtrack was composed by Mychael Danna but re-composed by Brad Fiedel for the international version. It also contains tracks from independent industrial band Black Rain who had initially recorded a score for Robert Longo that had been rejected.

Release and marketing

Simultaneous with Sony Pictures' release of the film, its soundtrack was released by Sony subsidiary Columbia Records, and the corporation's digital effects division Sony ImageWorks issued a CD-ROM videogame version for DOS, Mac and Windows 3.x. 
The Johnny Mnemonic videogame, which was developed by Evolutionary Publishing, Inc. and directed by Douglas Gayeton, offered 90 minutes of full motion video storytelling and puzzles. A Mega-CD/Sega CD version of the game was also developed, but never released despite being fully completed. This version was eventually leaked on the Internet many years later. A pinball machine based on the film designed by George Gomez was released in August 1995 by Williams.

Sony realised early on the potential for reaching their target demographic through Internet marketing, and its new-technology division promoted the film with an online scavenger hunt offering $20,000 in prizes. One executive was quoted as remarking "We see the Internet as turbo-charged word-of-mouth. Instead of one person telling another person something good is happening, it's one person telling millions!". The film's website, the first official site launched by Columbia TriStar Interactive, facilitated further cross-promotion by selling Sony Signatures-issued Johnny Mnemonic merchandise such as a "hack your own brain" T-shirt and Pharmakom coffee cups. Screenwriter William Gibson was deployed to field questions about the videogame from fans online. The habitually reclusive novelist, who despite creating in cyberspace one of the core metaphors for the internet age had never personally been on the Internet, likened the experience to "taking a shower with a raincoat on" and "trying to do philosophy in Morse code."

The film grossed ¥73.6 million ($897,600) in its first 3 days in Japan from 14 screens in the nine key Japanese cities. It was released in the United States and Canada on May 26 in 2,030 theaters, grossing $6 million in the opening weekend. It grossed $19.1 million in total in the United States and Canada and $52.4 million worldwide against its $26 million budget.

Johnny Mnemonic: In Black and White

 
On August 16, 2022, Sony Pictures Home Entertainment released Johnny Mnemonic: In Black and White on Blu-ray in the United States. 

A black-and-white version of the theatrical cut, the edition was developed by Robert Longo. While not a director's cut, it is nonetheless closer to Longo's intended vision for the film, as he had desired to originally film the movie in black-and-white, but was denied the opportunity to do so. Initially, for the film's 25th anniversary, Longo had ripped a Blu-ray copy of the film and had begun to create a black-and-white version of the film himself. After contacting Don Carmody and informing him of his intention to release the new version of the film on YouTube, Carmody requested to see it first. Impressed with the result, Carmody convinced Longo to approach Sony Pictures for an official release. Sony Pictures then agreed to provide the film's footage to Longo for a professional conversion, so that they could release the new version on Blu-ray. Longo proceeded to re-grade the film's color in black-and-white, with the help of the film's original colorist Cyrus Stowe. Longo has stated that he is "happy" with the new version of the film, as he takes inspiration from black-and-white films such as Alphaville and La Jetée. The new version was shown by the Tribeca and Rockaway Film Festivals at an outdoor screening, which sold out, in 2021.

Reception
The film holds an 18% approval rating on Rotten Tomatoes from 38 reviews, with an average rating of 4.1/10. The website's consensus reads, "As narratively misguided as it is woefully miscast, Johnny Mnemonic brings the '90s cyberpunk thriller to inane new whoas – er, lows."  On Metacritic, the film has a score of 36/100 based on 25 reviews, which the site terms "generally unfavorable reviews".

Varietys Todd McCarthy called the film "high-tech trash" and likened it to a video game.  Roger Ebert, the film critic for the Chicago Sun-Times, gave the film two stars out of four and called it "one of the great goofy gestures of recent cinema".  Owen Gleiberman of Entertainment Weekly rated it C− and called it "a slack and derivative future-shock thriller".  Conversely, Mick LaSalle of the San Francisco Chronicle described it as "inescapably a very cool movie", and Marc Savlov wrote in The Austin Chronicle that the film works well for both Gibson fans and those unfamiliar with his work.  Writing in The New York Times, Caryn James called the film "a disaster in every way" and said that despite Gibson's involvement, the film comes off as "a shabby imitation of Blade Runner and Total Recall".

McCarthy said that the film's premise is its "one bit of ingenuity", but the plot, which he called likely to disappoint Gibson's fans, is simply an excuse for "elaborate but undramatic and unexciting computer-graphics special effects".  Ebert also called the plot an excuse for the special effects, and the conceit of having to deliver important information while avoiding enemy agents struck him as "breathtakingly derivative".  Ebert furthermore felt that hiring a data courier instead of transmitting encrypted data over the internet makes no sense outside the artificiality of a film.  In his review for the Los Angeles Times, Peter Rainer wrote that the film, when stripped of the cyberpunk atmosphere, is recycled from noir fiction, and LaSalle viewed it more positively as "a hard-boiled action story using technology as its backdrop".  Savlov called it "an updated D.O.A.", and Ebert said the film's plot could have worked in any genre and been set in any time period.

James criticized the film's lack of tension, and Rainer called the film's tone too grim and lacking excitement.  McCarthy criticized what he saw as a "unrelieved grimness" and "desultory, darkly staged action scenes".  McCarthy felt the film's visual depiction of the future was unoriginal, and Gleiberman described the film as "Blade Runner with tackier sets".  Savlov wrote that Longo's "attempts to out-Blade Runner Ridley Scott in the decaying cityscape department grow wearisome".  Savlov still found the film "much better than expected".  LaSalle felt the film "introduces a fantastic yet plausible vision of a computer-dominated age" and maintains a focus on humanity, in contrast to Rainer, who found the film's countercultural pose to be inauthentic and lacking humanity.  James called the film murky and colorless; Rainer's review criticized similar issues, finding the film's lack of lighting and its grim set design to give everything an "undifferentiated dullness".  McCarthy found the special effects to be "slick and accomplished but unimaginative", though Ebert enjoyed the special effects.  Gleiberman highlighted the monofilament whip as his favorite special effect, though James found it unimpressive.

Although saying that Reeves is not a good actor, LaSalle said Reeves is still enjoyable to watch and makes for a compelling protagonist.  McCarthy instead found Reeves' character to be unlikable and one-dimensional.  James compared Reeves to a robot, and Gleiberman compared him to an action figure.  Rainer posited that Reeves' character may seem so blank due to his memory loss.  Savlov said that Reeves' wooden delivery gives the film unintentional humor, but Rainer found that the lack of humor throughout the film sapped all the acting performances of any enjoyment.  Gleiberman said that Reeves' efforts to avoid Valleyspeak backfire, giving his character's lines "an intense, misplaced urgency", though he liked the unconventional casting of Lundgren as a psychopathic street preacher. Rainer highlighted Lundgren as the only actor to display mirth and said his performance was the best in the film.  James called Ice-T's role stereotypical and said he deserved better.

Reeves's performance in the film earned him a Golden Raspberry Award nomination for Worst Actor (also for A Walk in the Clouds), but he lost to Pauly Shore for Jury Duty. The film was filed under the Founders Award (What Were They Thinking and Why?) at the 1995 Stinkers Bad Movie Awards and was also a dishonourable mention for Worst Picture.

In a career retrospective of Reeves' films for Entertainment Weekly, Chris Nashawaty ranked the film as Reeves' second worst, calling the film's fans "nuts" for liking it.  While acknowledging the film's issues, critic Ty Burr attributed its poor reviews to critics' unfamiliarity with Gibson's work.  The Quietus described the film as having "all the makings of a cult classic", and its release to streaming sites in 2021 resulted in a passionate defense by Rowan Righelato in The Guardian, who said it was "a testament to Longo’s genius" that the film remained as eccentric as it was despite the studio's recut. Inverse also recommended the film.  In a retrospective review from 2021, Peter Bradshaw, film critic for The Guardian, rated it 4/5 stars and wrote, "Perhaps it's quaint, but it's also watchable, and it is the kind of sci-fi that is genuinely audacious".  The Wachowskis used this film as template for The Matrix.

The props from the film were transformed into sculptures by artist Dora Budor for her 2015 solo exhibition, Spring.

References

External links
 
 
 

1995 films
1990s science fiction action films
1995 science fiction films
1990s dystopian films
Canadian science fiction action films
Cyberpunk films
American science fiction action films
Films about computing
Films about telepresence
American chase films
Films based on short fiction
Films based on science fiction works
Films set in 2021
Films shot in Toronto
1990s Japanese-language films
American dystopian films
TriStar Pictures films
Works by William Gibson
Films shot in Montreal
Films set in New Jersey
Films set in Beijing
Transhumanism in film
Films about dolphins
Films about artificial intelligence
Cryptography in fiction
Fiction about corporate warfare
Films produced by Don Carmody
Films scored by Brad Fiedel
1995 directorial debut films
Alliance Films films
1990s English-language films
1990s American films
1990s Canadian films